There were elections in 1929 to the United States House of Representatives:

70th Congress 

|-
! 
| William A. Oldfield
| 
| 1908
|  | Incumbent died November 19, 1928.New member elected January 9, 1929.Democratic hold.
| nowrap | 

|-
! 
| Charles L. Faust
|  | Republican
| 1921 
|  | Incumbent died December 17, 1928.New member elected February 5, 1929.Republican hold.
| nowrap | 

|}

71st Congress 
Elections are listed by date and district.

|-
! 
| William A. Oldfield
| 
| 1908
|  | Incumbent died November 19, 1928.New member elected January 9, 1929.Democratic hold.
| nowrap | 

|-
! 
| Charles L. Faust
|  | Republican
| 1921 
|  | Incumbent died December 17, 1928.New member elected February 5, 1929.Republican hold.
| nowrap | 

|-
! 
| Charles W. Roark
|  | Republican
| 1928
|  | Incumbent died April 5, 1929.New member elected June 1, 1929.Democratic gain.
| nowrap | 

|-
! 
| John J. Casey
|  | Democratic
| 19121916 19181920 19221924 1926
|  | Incumbent died May 5, 1929.New member elected June 1, 1929.Republican gain.
| nowrap | 

|-
! 
| Walter Newton
|  | Republican
| 1918
|  | Incumbent resigned June 30, 1929, after being appointed secretary to President Herbert Hoover.New member elected July 17, 1929.Republican hold.
| nowrap | 

|-
! 
| Whitmell P. Martin
|  | Democratic
| 1912
|  | Incumbent died April 6, 1929.New member elected August 6, 1929.Democratic hold.
| nowrap | 

|-
! 
| Leslie J. Steele
|  | Democratic
| 1926
|  | Incumbent died July 24, 1929.New member elected October 2, 1929.Democratic hold.
| nowrap | 

|-
! 
| Ole J. Kvale
|  | Farmer–Labor
| 1922
|  | Incumbent died September 11, 1929.New member elected October 16, 1929.Farmer–Labor hold.
| nowrap | 

|-
! 
| Royal Hurlburt Weller
|  | Democratic
| 1922
|  | Incumbent member-elect died March 1, 1929.New member elected November 5, 1929.Democratic hold.
| nowrap | 

|}

References 

 
1929